On 5 March 2021, suspected Oromo Liberation Army gunmen attacked the village of Debos Kebele killing 29 civilians.

Attack
On 5 March 2021, gunmen believed to be aligned with the OLA attacked the village of Debos Kebele. At Abo church, civilians had gathered to celebrate Lent. Suspected OLA soldiers then entered the town and stormed the church where they shot and killed the administrator of the church. Oromo fighters removed about 28 people from the church and then raped the women. They then took the group to a forest called Gerji where all 28 people including 21 women and 7 children were executed.

Responsibility
Several witnesses claim OLA fighters carried out the massacre. The OLA soon released a statement on the attack claiming that they do not target people based on their ethnicity and that the attack was carried out by a rogue OLA splinter group led by Faqadaa Abdiisaa.

References

Massacres of Amhara people
2021 crimes in Ethiopia
Massacres in 2021
Massacres in Ethiopia
Mass murder in 2021
Ethnic cleansing
Ethiopian civil conflict (2018–present)
2021 mass shootings in Africa
21st-century mass murder in Ethiopia
June 2021 crimes in Africa
Mass shootings in Ethiopia
Oromia Region
Oromo Liberation Front
Terrorist incidents in Africa in 2022
Terrorist incidents in Ethiopia